The A89 is a trunk road in Scotland, United Kingdom. It runs from High Street, Glasgow to Newbridge in Edinburgh. It was once the A8, which has now been replaced, mostly by the M8.

Within Glasgow, The Gallowgate, Shettleston Road, Baillieston Road, Glasgow Road and [Baillieston] Main Street have the A89 designation. As well as the aforementioned neighbourhoods bearing the road names, the A89 also passes through The Calton, northern Parkhead, Sandyhills and Garrowhill. Following major roadworks in the mid-2010s, the A89 now merges with the A8 Edinburgh Road (which has another meeting point at Glasgow Cross) for a short stretch near Swinton before a large roundabout leads the routes to split again, with the A8 feeding an interchange for the M8 and M73 motorways while the A89 passes under the M73 as Coatbridge Road, whereupon a further roundabout then reinstates the A8 as an alternative route along its old path, parallel to the new M8).

Leaving Glasgow, the A89 passes through Bargeddie, Coatbridge (meeting the start of the A725, effectively the south-eastern bypass of Glasgow), Airdrie (meeting the A73), Plains, Caldercruix, Blackridge, Armadale (meeting the A801 which connects the M8 and the M9), Bathgate, Boghall, Dechmont (meeting the A899 Livingston Interchange), Uphall, Broxburn before terminating at a roundabout in Newbridge which feeds Junction 1 of the M9. At this point, the road continues east as the A8 towards Edinburgh Airport, the A720 bypass then into the city itself.

References

External links
 Facebook Place
 A89 Sabre

Roads in Scotland
Transport in Glasgow
Transport in North Lanarkshire
Transport in West Lothian
Transport in Edinburgh
Bridgeton–Calton–Dalmarnock
Parkhead
Coatbridge
Baillieston
Broxburn, West Lothian
Armadale, West Lothian
Bathgate
Airdrie, North Lanarkshire